Anthon Eriksson (born February 25, 1995) is a Swedish ice hockey player. He is currently playing with GKS Katowice of the Polish Hockey League (PHL).

Eriksson made his Swedish Hockey League debut playing with Luleå HF during the 2013–14 SHL season. Since the 2021–2022, season he plays in GKS Katowice, Poland.

References

External links

1995 births
Living people
Luleå HF players
Swedish ice hockey centres